Lord Nelson "Nels" Roney (September 2, 1853 – November 24, 1944) was a building contractor and carpenter working primarily in the U.S. state of Oregon. He designed and built many of Oregon's early covered bridges, often using the Howe truss. Roney also built bridges for the Oregon and California Railroad from Roseburg, Oregon south to Redding, California, and he constructed commercial buildings and houses in Eugene, Oregon.

Early life
Roney was born in Wapakoneta, Ohio, on September 2, 1853, one of 12 children. His parents named him Lord Nelson in honor of the British admiral and hero, Lord Horatio Nelson. Roney may have found the name pretentious, and he preferred "Nels." The Roneys moved to Missouri where Nels began a three-year apprenticeship as a carpenter, earning 17 cents per day his first year. His wages increased to 36 cents per day his second year, and 54 cents per day his third year.

Roney settled in Eugene City (now Eugene) in 1876, when the local population had almost reached 1,000.

Bridge building
Eugene Skinner had operated a ferry crossing the Willamette River near his Donation Land Claim, but Roney arrived at a time when the growing town of Eugene City needed a bridge. Roney worked on the bridge project, a precursor to Ferry Street Bridge. When many Oregon bridges washed out in the floods of January 1881, Roney was often hired to rebuild.

As the Oregon and California Railroad expanded south into California, Roney took charge of bridge building from Roseburg to Redding.

In 1912 Roney was appointed Superintendent of Lane County bridges.

Commercial and residential buildings
Roney is credited with building many commercial and residential structures in Eugene. A partial list includes
Villard Hall (with W. H. Abrams)
McMorran and Washburne Department Store Building
First National Bank Building
Smeede Hotel (employed by George H. Park)
Hoffman House Hotel (demolished)
Eugene Opera House (demolished)
Lane County Courthouse tower (demolished)
Lane County Bank (demolished)
Shelton McMurphey Johnson House
Episcopal and Methodist churches

See also
List of Oregon covered bridges
National Register of Historic Places listings in Lane County, Oregon

References

Further reading

External links
Lee Nelson Collection box 7, folder 60, and box 17, folder 168

1853 births
1944 deaths
American carpenters
People from Eugene, Oregon
People from Wapakoneta, Ohio